Hibbertia nitida is a species of flowering plant in the family Dilleniaceae and is endemic to the Central Coast of New South Wales. It is an erect shrub with lance-shaped leaves with the narrower end towards the base and yellow flowers with about eleven stamens arranged on one side of two silky-hairy carpels.

Description
The flowers are arranged in leaf axils or near the ends of branches and are sessile. There are about eleven stamens arranged around the two silky-hairy carpels. Flowering mainly occurs in spring.

Taxonomy
This species was first formally described in 1817 by Augustin Pyramus de Candolle from an unpublished description by Robert Brown. De Candolle's description was published in his Regni Vegetabilis Systema Naturale. In 1863, George Bentham changed the name to Hibbertia nitida in Flora Australiensis.

Distribution and habitat
Hibbertia nitida grows on sandstone and is widespread in the Sydney region.

References

nitida
Flora of New South Wales
Taxa named by Augustin Pyramus de Candolle
Plants described in 1817